Man of Steel: Original Motion Picture Soundtrack is the soundtrack to the film of the same name composed by Hans Zimmer. It was released on June 11, 2013, by WaterTower Music and Sony Classical Records. The exclusive deluxe edition of the album contains six bonus tracks, entitled "Are You Listening, Clark?", "General Zod", "You Led Us Here", "This Is Madness!", "Earth" and "Arcade".

Hans Zimmer initially denied popular rumors that he would be composing the film's soundtrack, but in June 2012, Zimmer was in fact writing the film's musical score. To completely distinguish Man of Steel from the previous films, the iconic "Superman March" by John Williams is not heard. The musical score from the third trailer, entitled "An Ideal of Hope", was released online for listening purposes on April 19, 2013. This music was a shortened version of the album track "What Are You Going to Do When You Are Not Saving the World?". In late April the same year, the official track listing of the two-disc deluxe edition was revealed.

Popular reception to the score was positive and the album rose to #4 on iTunes during the first week of its release. Critical reception for the score, however, has been polarized.
The soundtrack opened at number 9 on the Billboard 200 with 32,000 copies sold.

At the Brit Awards, Zimmer won as "Composer of the Year" for his work on the scores of Man of Steel and The Dark Knight Rises.

Critical response 
While popular among fans, the score was polarizing among critics. Some were quite disappointed by the score, citing it as being repetitive, simplistic and over-reliant on drums, while others reacted more positively.

In her review of the film, Ann Hornday, from The Washington Post, called the score "turgid" and "over-produced". 
Jonathan Broxton of Movie Music UK commended the tracks "Flight" and "What are You Doing When You're Not Saving the World?" as the best in the soundtrack album, but criticized the lack of development of those themes and the simplicity of the writing: "For [Superman] to be saddled with witless percussion, such predictable string writing, and such a simplistic and repetitive thematic statement is disappointing in the extreme".
Christian Clemmensen of Filmtracks.com dismissed the score as a "lowest common denominator" effort, criticizing the excessive use of percussion over other instruments, such as woodwinds or chimes. He concluded by saying: "Ultimately, Zimmer was right. He was the wrong man for this assignment".
James Southall, of Movie Wave, cited concerns with the score's over-reliance on a brass effect, dubbed "horn of doom" (made popular with the music from Inception) and wrote: "Man of Steel – the film – may not have the ambition of Inception – but it still has its unique musical needs, and they’re just not satisfied".

Conversely, James Christopher Monger, writing for Allmusic, called the soundtrack "grittier and darker than any of its predecessors, due in large part to Zimmer's proclivity for non-stop, thunderous percussion, though it retains enough goose bump-inducing moments to be called a proper Superman score, especially on the elegiac "Look to the Stars" and its soaring counterpart "What Are You Going to Do When You Are Not Saving the World?", both of which dutifully reflect the iconic superhero's propensity for both goodness and might". Chris McEneany of AVForums stated that Zimmer, despite his excessive use of drums, "[came] up with a work that is blistering, beautiful, bold and, I have to say it, brilliant". Jørn Tillnes of Soundtrackgeek gave the score a rave review: "The purists, the soundtrack geeks of old will no doubt hate this score and will use every ounce of their energy to bash it as nothing more than generic droning music. For the rest of us, I believe the new bold direction the Superman franchise is taking is both brilliant and brave. Superman deserves this score and so do you".

Track listing

Standard edition 
All music by Hans Zimmer, except where noted.

Limited Deluxe edition 

Music appearing in the film and not included on the soundtrack

Personnel 

Primary artist
Hans Zimmer – composer, producer

Production
Peter Asher – co-producer

Orchestrators
Bruce Fowler
Elizabeth Finch
Kevin Kaska
Rick Giovinazzo

Additional music
Tom Holkenborg – additional music
Atli Örvarsson – additional music
Andrew Kawczynski – additional music
Steve Mazzaro – additional music
Geoff Zanelli – additional music

Additional personnel and recording
Mel Wesson – ambient music design
Czarina Russell – score coordinator
Steven Kofsky – music production services
Melissa Muik – music editor
Howard Scarr – synth programmer
Mark Wherry – digital instrument design
Alan Meyerson – music score mixing
Hilda "Thórhildur" Örvarsdóttir – vocals

Percussion Session Musicians
Matt Chamberlain
Josh Freese
Danny Carey
Jason Bonham
Pharrell Williams
Sheila E.
John JR Robinson
Satnam Ramgotra 
Toss Panos
Jim Keltner
Vinnie Colaiuta
Bernie Dresel
Curt Bisquera
Trevor Lawrence, Jr.
Ryeland Allison

Musicians
Martin Tillman
Ann Marie Calhoun
Bryce Jacobs

Charts

Weekly charts

Year-end charts

References

External links 
 Official site

2013 soundtrack albums
2010s film soundtrack albums
Hans Zimmer soundtracks
WaterTower Music soundtracks
Superman soundtracks
DC Extended Universe soundtracks
Superhero film soundtracks